Zhou Wen may refer to:
 Zhou Wen (footballer)
 Zhou Wen (serial killer)